Du Pont Motors was founded by E. Paul du Pont to produce marine engines for the Allied nations during World War I.  After the war, Du Pont Motors produced extremely high-end automobiles. The cars were manufactured in Wilmington, Delaware.

E. Paul du Pont's resources allowed him to hire top-quality automotive and management talent. The company's first product, the Model A, was introduced at the 1919 International Salon at the Commodore Hotel in New York City (an event for the wealthy by invitation only, along with the finest manufacturers and coach builders).

Between 1919 and 1931, the company produced approximately 625 automobiles,. They were compared to such luxury cars as Packard, Cadillac and even Stutz, and Duesenberg, and were known for their quality and style. Customers included Mary Pickford and Douglas Fairbanks, Will Rogers, and Jack Dempsey.

The company went bankrupt in 1932 and merged into the Indian Motorcycle Company when E. Paul du Pont purchased the latter company.

Du Pont model G
The Du Pont Model G was the first 8 cylinder model from Du Pont Motors in Wilmington, Delaware.

The car was powered by a Continental 12-K side-valve straight eight cylinder engine with a displacement of 321.8 c.i. (5.3 litre), delivering 125 bhp. Du Pont added an aluminum cover over the distributor, spark plugs and wiring for water and dust protection. There was a 3 speed transmission. Included were four-wheel hydraulic brakes, and hydraulic shock absorbers. Standard wheelbase was 136 in., with 141 in. available for formal coachwork, and a speedster with 125 in. There were 12 factory body styles to choose from, manufactured for Du Pont by Merrimac, Derham, and Waterhouse. The rolling chassis was available for other coachbuilders. Prices ranged from US$4,360 ($ in  dollars ) to US$5,750 ($ in  dollars ), with Speedsters up to US$6,125 ($ in  dollars ).

Du Pont model H
The Du Pont Model H was the last motor car line for Du Pont Motors. In 1930 the Model H was introduced, which was basically a Model G but with a longer wheelbase that measured 146-inches. A total of three were built consisting of a two car and two sport models. The sports chassis were later bodied as a sport phaeton and a closed-coupled sedan by Dietrich. The other received a formal Berline body and a flat radiator.

Gallery

See also
Du Pont family
Indian (motorcycle)
List of defunct United States automobile manufacturers
History of the automobile

Notes and references

DuPont subsidiaries
Luxury motor vehicle manufacturers
Defunct motor vehicle manufacturers of the United States
Companies based in Wilmington, Delaware
1919 establishments in Delaware
1932 disestablishments in Pennsylvania
Vehicle manufacturing companies established in 1919
Vehicle manufacturing companies disestablished in 1932
Defunct manufacturing companies based in Delaware
Vintage vehicles
1920s cars
1930s cars